Jacques Faizant (30 October 1918 in Laroquebrou - 14 January 2006 in Suresnes) was a French caricaturist and editorial cartoonist.

1918 births
2006 deaths
French editorial cartoonists
French caricaturists
People from Cantal